Frizzell Hotsprings is a hot spring on the south bank of the Skeena River, northeast of Hotspring Point, near Prince Rupert, British Columbia, Canada.

Description
The hot spring water emerges from a series of vents, and forms a hot creek that flows to the river mudflats. There is a deep soaking tub large enough to fit several people. The water temperature in the soaking pool is 41°C/106°F. There is a small cabin and a hut near the soaking pool.

The springs are accessible by boat only at high tide. Access is very difficult, and only experienced boaters should attempt to approach this site. Several people have died recently and in the past 10 years trying to cross the Skeena River to reach the springs.

History
In the early 20th century there was a vibrant cannery town nearby, and Japanese fishermen would frequent the hot springs. In the 1920s, George Frizzell bought the property where the springs are located, and he built a bathhouse there.

The hot springs are privately owned and visiting without owner permission is an actionable trespass.

See also
List of hot springs

References

Hot springs of British Columbia
Skeena Country